Acianthera butcheri is a species of orchid plant native to Panama.

References 

butcheri
Flora of Panama